Siboniso Gaxa (born 6 April 1984 in Durban, KwaZulu-Natal), nicknamed Pa is a South African retired football defender who played for big clubs such as Ajax Cape Town, Kaizer Chiefs F.C. ,Mamelodi Sundowns F.C. and as Bafana Bafana defender.

Personal
He hails from KwaMashu, Durban. He was given the nickname "Pa" which is shortened from "Papa" which means "father" because when he was a child he behaved like an adult. He was always very mature.

He graduated from University of the Witwatersrand with a degree in Political Science and Social Studies in 2019.

Club career
Gaxa attended the University of Port Elizabeth, which at that time had a football team controlled by Danish side F.C. Copenhagen. However, he was not one of the three players, Elrio van Heerden, Lee Langeveldt and Bongumusa Mthethwa, who made it from the FCK-UPE Academy to F.C. Copenhagen. He is managed by ExtraTime S.L.

In 2002, he moved to Supersport United, where he stayed for six seasons, before joining Mamelodi Sundowns in 2008. In 2010, he moved to Belgian club Lierse. After the 2011–12 season, he was released by the team. On 15 May 2012 Gaxa signed a three-year contract for Kaizer Chiefs with the option to renew for one year. After 99 league appearances and 1 goal for Chiefs, he was released at the end of the 2015–16 season.

He signed a short-term contract with Bidvest Wits in November 2016, but was released by Bidvest Wits in October 2017 following the expiry of his deal in the summer.

Gaxa signed for Ajax Cape Town in February 2018. He retired later that year after leaving Ajax Cape Town.

International career
Gaxa made his international debut in a 2006 FIFA World Cup qualifier against Cape Verde on 4 June 2005.
He was part of South Africa's squad at the 2005 CONCACAF Gold Cup, 2006 African Cup of Nations, 2009 FIFA Confederations Cup, 2010 FIFA World Cup and 2013 African Cup of Nations.

Honours

Supersport United
MTN 8 – 2004
Nedbank Cup – 2005
Premier Soccer League – 2007/08

Kaizer Chiefs
Premier Soccer League – 2012/13
Premier Soccer League – 2014/15
Nedbank Cup – 2013
Carling Black Label – 2013
MTN 8 – 2014

Bidvest Wits
Premier Soccer League – 2016/17
MTN 8 – 2016

References

External links

1984 births
Living people
Sportspeople from Durban
South African soccer players
Association football defenders
Association football midfielders
South Africa international soccer players
2005 CONCACAF Gold Cup players
2006 Africa Cup of Nations players
2009 FIFA Confederations Cup players
2010 FIFA World Cup players
2013 Africa Cup of Nations players
South African expatriate soccer players
South African expatriate sportspeople in Belgium
Expatriate footballers in Belgium
Belgian Pro League players
SuperSport United F.C. players
Mamelodi Sundowns F.C. players
Lierse S.K. players
Kaizer Chiefs F.C. players
Nelson Mandela University alumni